The 2003–04 Macedonian Second Football League was the twelfth season since its establishment. It began on 9 August 2003 and ended on 2 June 2004.

Participating teams

League standing

Results

See also
2003–04 Macedonian Football Cup
2003–04 Macedonian First Football League

References

External links
Macedonia - List of final tables (RSSSF)
Football Federation of Macedonia 
MacedonianFootball.com 

Macedonia 2
2
Macedonian Second Football League seasons